Fiodar Andrejevič Makhnov or Feodor Andreevich Makhnov was born in 1878 at the village of Kostyuki near Viciebsk, then part of the Russian Empire (now in Belarus). Exact details such as his height and weight are unconfirmed.

Biography 
As a young man in his twenties he toured Europe to exhibit his great height. After having spent time in Berlin he visited London in 1905 where he joined the Hippodrome accompanied by his wife and young child. He then toured the United States in 1906 where he met President Roosevelt as well as actor and fellow giant George Auger. On the obelisk it is still possible to read: «Фёдор Андреевич Махнов. Родился 6 июня 1878 года. Умер 28 августа 1912 года. Самый высокий человек в мире. Ростом был 3 аршина 9 вершков» ("Feodor Machnow. Born 6 June 1878. Died 28 August 1912. Tallest man in the world. His height was 3 arshins 9 vershoks [254 centimetres] tall"). Machnow's wife, Efrosinja wanted to correct the incorrect figure on the monument, but was prevented from doing so because of the beginning of the First World War and then the Revolution of 1917.

This exaggeration may have been because he wore a huge Cossack fur hat, and tall boots which added a foot to his height. Although, if this was accurate, he would have been taller than Robert Wadlow, now cited as the world's tallest man.

Machnow died in 1912 due to pneumonia, and likely complications of acromegaly. He was the father of four children, none of whom reached a height greater than two meters.

See also
List of tallest people
Alexander Sizonenko
Angus MacAskill
Igor Ladan
Leonid Stadnyk
Nikolay Valuev
Robert Wadlow

References

External links

 

1878 births
1912 deaths
People from the Russian Empire
People with gigantism